Beautiful view of koosalli waterfalls in monsoon
.
The Koosalli Waterfalls is a large waterfall located in a deep, rocky forest near Koosalli village in Byndoor taluk, Udupi District. Koosalli Waterfalls is a cascading waterfall with six different waterfalls dropping from a height of 470 feet. If you love adventure then this is one of the go to place while you are in Udupi district.
Video credits : Anudeep Hegde
.
.
udupitourism #byndoor #incredibleindia
The Koosalli Waterfalls is a large waterfall located in a deep, rocky forest near Koosalli village in Karnataka, India. The waterfall is 15 km from Shiroor via Toodalli and 4 km from Koosalli village. Koosalli Waterfalls is a cascading waterfall with six different waterfalls dropping from a height of 470 feet.

References 

Geography of Udupi district
Waterfalls of Karnataka